Carl Johan Silfverstrand (9 October 1885 – 2 January 1975) was a Swedish track and field athlete and gymnast who competed in the 1908 and 1912 Summer Olympics. In 1908 he finished tenth in the pole vault and twentieth long jump. In 1912 he was part of the Swedish gymnastics team that won the gold medal in the Swedish system event.

Silfverstrand competed for Stockholm clubs, though he lived in Helsingborg. After retiring from competitions he worked as a sports instructor in Finland (1919–20 and 1925–27), Denmark (1922–25) and Norway (1927–36). In 1933 he received Norwegian citizenship, and between 1936 and 1941 worked as a physical therapist in Norway.

References

1885 births
1975 deaths
Swedish male long jumpers
Swedish male pole vaulters
Swedish male artistic gymnasts
Athletes (track and field) at the 1908 Summer Olympics
Gymnasts at the 1912 Summer Olympics
Olympic athletes of Sweden
Olympic gymnasts of Sweden
Olympic gold medalists for Sweden
Olympic medalists in gymnastics
Medalists at the 1912 Summer Olympics
Sportspeople from Helsingborg
20th-century Swedish people